In baseball, a golden sombrero is a player's inglorious feat of striking out four times in a single game.

Etymology
The term derives from hat trick, and since four is bigger than three, the rationale was that a four-strikeout performance should be referred to by a bigger hat, such as a sombrero. Though one account credits San Diego Padres player Carmelo Martínez with inventing the term in the 1980s, "sombrero" was already in use to describe a four strikeout game as early as 1977, and "golden sombrero" appeared in print in a 1979 article about slang used by the minor league Jackson Mets.

The "Olympic Rings" or platinum sombrero applies to a player striking out five times in a game.

A horn refers to a player striking out six times in a game; the term was coined by pitcher Mike Flanagan after teammate Sam Horn of the Baltimore Orioles accomplished the feat in an extra-inning game in 1991. Alternate names for this accomplishment are titanium sombrero or double platinum sombrero.

Major League Baseball

Notable recent four-strikeout games
On August 4, 2009, Tampa Bay Rays third baseman Evan Longoria went 2-for-6, recording a golden sombrero and two home runs. The second home run was a walk off home run. This feat was also accomplished by Brandon Moss of the Oakland Athletics on April 30, 2013 in a 19-inning game against the Los Angeles Angels.

On May 29, 2015, San Diego Padres catcher Derek Norris struck out swinging in his first four plate appearances, then hit a walk-off grand slam, becoming the first MLB player in the modern era to achieve a golden sombrero and a walk-off grand slam in the same game.

On July 30, 2016, New York Yankees player Alex Rodriguez became the first MLB player to earn a golden sombrero after the age of 40 while having earned one before the age of 20.

On October 11, 2017, Chicago Cubs third baseman Kris Bryant (0-for-4) and New York Yankees right fielder Aaron Judge (0-for-5) each recorded golden sombreros. Judge's sombrero was his third in the ALDS; he became the only player since 1903 to have three four-strikeout games in the same postseason. Prior to the start of the 2017 World Series, golden sombreros in the 2017 postseason had already tied the record set in 1997. An increase in the use of starting pitchers as relievers has been suggested as a cause.

Major league players with the most four-strikeout games

Notable five-strikeout games

Sammy Sosa, Ray Lankford, and Javier Baez are the only players to earn a platinum sombrero more than twice.

On March 31, 1996, Ron Karkovice became the first (and so far only) player to earn a platinum sombrero on Opening Day.

On July 25, 2017, Chicago Cubs infielder Javier Baez went 0-for-5, recording a platinum sombrero. On the same day, Seattle Mariners designated hitter Nelson Cruz went 0-for-6 with five strikeouts, also recording a platinum sombrero. This marked the first time in major league history in which two players from two different games achieved platinum sombreros on the same day.

On April 3, 2018, Giancarlo Stanton recorded a platinum sombrero in his home debut for the New York Yankees. Stanton was booed as he left the field after his fifth strikeout. Five days later, he became the first player to record two platinum sombreros in one season when he went 0-for-7 and struck out to end the game with two runners on and the Yankees down by one run. Stanton later recorded a golden sombrero in Game 1 of the 2018 American League Division Series, his second career playoff game.

On June 22, 2016, Washington Nationals outfielder Michael A. Taylor recorded a platinum sombrero in a game against the Los Angeles Dodgers. In a performance one sportswriter suggested might be "the worst game in baseball history", Taylor went 0-for-5 with five Ks while leaving five men on base, and committed an error in the ninth inning that lost his team the game.

On June 4, 2018, New York Yankees outfielder Aaron Judge earned a platinum sombrero and struck out a total of eight times over the course of a doubleheader against the Detroit Tigers, setting an MLB record.

On May 26, 2019, Colorado Rockies shortstop Trevor Story recorded a platinum sombrero in a nine-inning game against the Baltimore Orioles. The next day, May 27, Chicago Cubs shortstop Javier Baez also recorded a platinum sombrero against the Houston Astros, his second. 

On June 18, 2019, Boston Red Sox designated hitter J. D. Martinez and Minnesota Twins third baseman Miguel Sanó recorded platinum sombreros in a seventeen-inning game.

On September 30, 2020, St. Louis Cardinals outfielder Harrison Bader earned his platinum sombrero in Game One of the 2020 National League Wild Card Series between the Cardinals and the San Diego Padres, joining George Pipgras of the 1932 New York Yankees  Reggie Sanders of the 1995 Cincinnati Reds,   Cleveland Guardians   Andres Gimenez and Tampa Bay Rays Jose Siri as the only players in MLB history to accomplish this feat in the playoffs. He finished 0-for-5 with six men left on base, though his Cardinals won 7–4.

On October 8, 2022, Cleveland Guardians second baseman Andres Gimenez and Tampa Bay Rays centerfielder Jose Siri recorded platinum sombreros in a 15-inning playoff game, the only known occasion in which two players each had five strikeouts in the same playoff game. Gimenez finished 0–5 and was on deck when the game ended 1–0 with a walkoff home run by Oscar Gonzalez.

Major league players with six strikeouts in a game
Only eight players have had six strikeouts in one game, as listed in the following table. All eight instances occurred in games that were completed in extra innings; the record for strikeouts in a nine-inning game is five.

Minor League Baseball
The professional baseball record for strikeouts in a single game belongs to Khalil Lee, who as a member of the minor league Lexington Legends, Class A affiliate of the Kansas City Royals, struck out eight times in a 21-inning game in 2017.

College Baseball
University of Texas catcher Cameron Rupp struck out six times in the Texas Longhorns record-setting 25-inning game against the Boston College Eagles on May 30, 2009.

References

External links

 Rocky Mountain News August 17, 2006 quoting Don Baylor
 Athlon Sports May 8, 2007: 4 leadoff hitters with golden sombrero.
 Baseball Reference – Most natural golden sombreros
 Baseball Almanac – Strikeout Records for Hitters

Baseball terminology